Ivonei Júnior da Silva Rabelo (born 16 April 2002), simply known as Ivonei, is a Brazilian footballer who plays for Santos as a midfielder.

Club career
Born in Rondonópolis, Mato Grosso, Ivonei joined Santos' youth setup in 2013, from Vila Aurora. On 2 October 2018, he signed his first professional contract with the club, until 2021.

In June 2020, after the COVID-19 pandemic, Ivonei was promoted to the main squad by manager Jesualdo Ferreira. He made his professional – and Série A – debut on 13 August, coming on as a second-half substitute for fellow youth graduate Alison in a 2–0 away loss against Internacional.

Ivonei made his Copa Libertadores debut on 1 October 2020, replacing Jobson in a 3–2 away win against Club Olimpia. On 23 October, he renewed his contract with the club until July 2025.

Ivonei scored his first professional goal on 14 November 2020, netting the opener in a 2–0 home win against Internacional; it was also his first career start. He subsequently featured rarely during the 2021 season before being demoted back to the under-20 squad in March 2022.

International career
On 27 October 2017, Ivonei was called up to Brazil under-15 football team for the 2017 South American U-15 Championship in Argentina. He scored one goal during the competition, in a 3–1 home defeat of Venezuela, as his side finished second.

Personal life
Ivonei's father Nei was also a footballer, who notably represented Vila Aurora.

Career statistics

References

External links
Santos FC profile 

2002 births
Living people
People from Rondonópolis
Brazilian footballers
Association football midfielders
Campeonato Brasileiro Série A players
Santos FC players
Brazil youth international footballers
Sportspeople from Mato Grosso